The Johnson Chapel Missionary Baptist Church (also known as the Osprey Baptist Church) is a historic church in Laurel, Florida. It is located at 506 Church Street. On October 8, 1997, it was added to the U.S. National Register of Historic Places.

References

External links
 Sarasota County listings at National Register of Historic Places
 Johnson Chapel Missionary Baptist Church at Florida's Office of Cultural and Historical Programs

Baptist churches in Florida
National Register of Historic Places in Sarasota County, Florida
Churches on the National Register of Historic Places in Florida
Churches in Sarasota County, Florida